AK and A.K. (but not Ak) may refer to:

Arts and entertainment
 A.K. (film), a 1985 film directed by Chris Marker
 AK (radio program), a weekly program produced by Alaska Public Radio Network from 2003 to 2008, later a segment on Alaska News Nightly
 AK (rapper), also known as AK the Razorman, American rapper from Atlanta, Georgia, member of hip hop group P$C
 AK-47 (rapper), American rapper from Chicago, Illinois, member of hip hop group Do or Die
 AK the Savior, American rapper from Brooklyn, New York, member of The Underachievers
 Arknights, the Chinese mobile game developed by Hypergryph

Businesses and organizations
 AK Press, a collectively owned and operated independent publisher and book distributor that specializes in radical and anarchist literature
 AK Steel Holding Company, a US-based S&P 500 (NYSE:AKS) Steel Manufacturer
 Adalet ve Kalkınma Partisi, the Turkish Justice and Development Party
 Arbeiterkammer, the Austrian Chamber of Labour
 Armia Krajowa (Home Army), underground resistance in Nazi-occupied Poland during World War II
 Ajnad al-Kavkaz, a Chechen-led militia in the Syrian Civil War

Science
 AK, the herbarium code for Auckland War Memorial Museum 
Patient AK, a 16-year-old female patient who laughed when her brain was stimulated with electric current during treatment for epilepsy
 Actinic keratosis, a skin condition
 Applied kinesiology, a method using manual muscle testing that purportedly gives feedback on the functional status of the body

Places
 Alaska, a state in the US whose postal abbreviation is "AK"
 Azad Kashmir, a region of Pakistan.

Transport
 AirAsia (IATA code AK), a Malaysia-based airline
Cargo ships (US Navy hull classification symbol AK)
New Zealand AK class carriage passenger carriages used by KiwiRail on their Great Railway Journeys of New Zealand

Other uses
 Akan language (ISO 639-1 code alpha-2 ak)
 Kalashnikov rifle (Avtomat Kalashnikova) an originally Soviet/Russian series of rifles, e.g. AK-47, AKM, AK-74, AK-101, AK-103, etc.
 AK-47, shortened to "AK"
 Knight of the Order of Australia, awarded from 1976 to 1986, and 2014 to 2015
 Aktuaalne kaamera, a TV program of the Eesti Televisioon
 , the primary resistance movement in German-occupied Poland during World War II

See also
 Ak (disambiguation)